UGB may mean:
An unguided bomb
 L'Université Gaston Berger, located outside Saint-Louis, was the second university established in Senegal (the first being Cheikh Anta Diop University), see Gaston Berger University
 Unión de Guerreros Blancos (White Warriors' Union), a death squad founded to repress leftist elements in El Salvador
 Urban growth boundary, a term in urban planning
 Usines Gustave Boël, Belgian iron and steel company
 Uttarakhand Gramin Bank, a co-operative bank in Uttarakhand, India